Bobby Graham (born Robert Francis Neate, 11 March 1940 – 14 September 2009) was an English session drummer, composer, arranger and record producer. Shel Talmy, who produced the Kinks, David Bowie and the Who, described Graham as "the greatest drummer the UK has ever produced." In 1962 Graham was offered the drummers position in The Beatles when Pete Best was fired, with Ringo Starr eventually accepting the position.

Biography
Born at North Middlesex Hospital, Edmonton, North London, England, Graham became a member of the Outlaws and worked with Joe Meek. He left to join work with Joe Brown in 1961. Graham was a part of the British elite session team (comparable to the American "Wrecking Crew") made up of artists such as Big Jim Sullivan, Vic Flick and Jimmy Page.

Graham played on 13 number one singles, including those by the Dave Clark Five, Englebert Humperdinck, Peter and Gordon, Jackie Trent, the Kinks, Tom Jones and Dusty Springfield, and appeared on a total of 40 UK top five hits (10 number two hits; 4 number 3 hits; 6 number 4 hits; 7 number five hits; 107 top 50 hits - 1155 days in the charts). In a discography that counts approximately 15,000 titles, he played on hits by John Barry, Shirley Bassey, Joe Cocker, Billy Fury, Herman's Hermits, Benny Hill, Rod Stewart, Dave Berry, Joe Brown and the Bruvvers, Chubby Checker, Petula Clark, Brenda Lee, Lulu, Brian Poole & the Tremeloes, the Pretty Things, PJ Proby, Van Morrison, Them, the Walker Brothers, and Marianne Faithfull.

Graham also toured the UK as drummer in his own jazz band.

Death
On 14 September 2009, Bobby Graham died at the Isabel Hospice in Welwyn Garden City, Hertfordshire, England after battling stomach cancer for five months. He was 69.

Recording credits
Graham played on over 15,000 titles, including:
 "You Really Got Me", "All Day And All Of The Night" and "Tired of Waiting For You" by The Kinks
 "Good Morning Little Schoolgirl" by Rod Stewart
 "Downtown" and "I Know A Place" by Petula Clark
 "Green Green Grass of Home" by Tom Jones
 "Gloria" and "Baby Please Don't Go" by Them (ft. Van Morrison)
 "I Only Want to Be with You" by Dusty Springfield
 "I Believe" by The Bachelors
 "Is It True" by Brenda Lee. Produced by Mickie Most in 1964.
 "Glad All Over" and "Bits and Pieces" by The Dave Clark Five

Literature
Patrick Harrington: The Session Man (Broom House Publishing Ltd., 12 Nov 2004) -

References

External links
Official website

1940 births
2009 deaths
Deaths from stomach cancer
Deaths from cancer in England
English rock drummers
English jazz drummers
British male drummers
People from Edmonton, London
English session musicians
The Outlaws (band) members
British male jazz musicians
20th-century British male musicians